Holmes Junior High School is an historic junior high school building, which is located in the West Philadelphia neighborhood of Philadelphia, Pennsylvania, United States. 

The building was added to the National Register of Historic Places in 1988.

History and architectural features
Designed by Henry deCourcy Richards, Holmes Junior High School was built between 1916 and 1917. It is a three-story, six-bay, brick building, which was placed on a raised basement and designed in the Classical Revival-style. 

An addition was made to the "U"-shaped building shortly after it was completed in 1917, which features a slightly projecting center section, stone cornice and brick parapet.

The building was added to the National Register of Historic Places in 1988.

References

School buildings on the National Register of Historic Places in Philadelphia
Neoclassical architecture in Pennsylvania
School buildings completed in 1917
Defunct schools in Pennsylvania
West Philadelphia
1917 establishments in Pennsylvania